Xeira (in English: time or sequence) is a Marxist-leninist political youth organization in Galicia, with a pro-independence stance. It was founded in December 2013 to fill the political space of Adiante-Galician Revolutionary Youth, that self-dissolved weeks before the constitution of Xeira.

It is the youth organization of the Galician People's Front (FPG), one of the organizations participating in Anova-Nationalist Brotherhood.

References

External links
 Website of Xeira
 
 

Secessionist organizations in Europe
Galician nationalism
Marxism
Leninism